The Old English Sheepdog is a large breed of dog that emerged in England from early types of herding dog. The nickname Bob-tail (or Bobtail) originates from how dogs of the breed traditionally had their tails docked. Old English Sheepdogs can grow very long coats with fur covering the face and eyes and do not shed unless brushed.

Appearance
The Old English Sheepdog is a large dog, immediately recognizable by its long, thick, shaggy grey and white coat, with fur covering their face and eyes. The ears lie flat to the head. Historically, the breed's tail was commonly docked (resulting in a panda bear–like rear end), but tailed Old English sheepdogs are now common, as many countries have outlawed cosmetic docking.  When the dog has a tail, it has long fur (feathering), is low set, and normally hangs down. The Old English Sheepdog stands lower at the shoulder than at the loin, and walks with a "bear-like roll from the rear".

Height at the withers is at least 61 cm (24 in), with females slightly smaller than males. The body is short and compact, and ideal weights are not specified in the breed standards, but may be as much as 46 kg (101 lb) for large males.

Colour of the double coat may be any shade of grey, grizzle, black, blue, or blue merle, with optional white markings. The undercoat is water resistant. Puppies are born with a black and white coat, and it is only after the puppy coat has been shed that the more common grey or silver shaggy hair appears. Old English Sheepdogs only shed when they are brushed.

Docking
Undocked Old English Sheepdogs are becoming a more common sight as many countries have now banned docking. The Kennel Club (UK) and The Australian National Kennel Council breed standards do not express a preference for (legally) docked or un-docked animals, and either can be shown. The American Kennel Club breed standard states that the tail should be "docked close to the body, when not naturally ", even though the practice of cosmetic docking is now opposed by the American Veterinary Medical Association.  It is believed that the practice of tail docking came about in the 18th century as a result of taxation laws that required working dogs to be docked as evidence of their working status, but nowadays, in places where the practice is still legal, tail docking is mainly performed for purely cosmetic reasons.

History

The Old English Sheepdog comes from the pastoral type dogs of England. A small drop-eared dog seen in a 1771 painting by Gainsborough is believed by some to represent the early type of the Old English Sheepdog. In the early 19th century a bobtailed drovers dog, called the Smithfield or Cotswold Cor, was noticed in the southwestern counties of England and may have been an ancestor. Most fanciers agree that the Bearded Collie was among the original stock used in developing today's breed.  Some speculate that the Russian Owtchar was among the breed's ancestors.

The Old English Sheepdog was at first called the "Shepherd's Dog" and was exhibited for the first time at a show in Birmingham, England, in 1873. There were only three entries, and the judge felt the quality of the dogs was so poor that he offered only a second placing. From that beginning, the breed became a popular show dog, and, although the shape of the dog itself has changed very little over the years, elaborate grooming including backcombing and powdering the fur was recorded as early as 1907. The breed was exported to the United States in the 1880s, and by the turn of the 20th century, five of the ten wealthiest American families bred and showed the Old English Sheepdog. The breed continues to be a popular show dog today.

The best recent finish of an Old English Sheepdog at the Westminster Kennel Club dog show was in 2013 when Bugaboo's Picture Perfect was awarded Reserve Best in Show.

Health
US and UK surveys put the average lifespan of the Old English Sheepdog at 12–15 years.  The Old English Sheepdog Club of America sponsors investigations into diseases encountered in the breed in order to assist breeders in selecting healthy dogs for breeding, and breeders of Old English Sheepdogs who are members of the Old English Sheepdog Club of America must support its Code of Ethics in breeding and selling sheepdogs. Some diseases being investigated include hip dysplasia, cataracts, glaucoma, entropion, thyroid problems, deafness, diabetes, HD, PRA, allergies and skin problems. There is no data on how many dogs are affected, or what percent of the breed is affected by any of these ailments. Heatstroke is also a serious concern in full coated dogs. Cancer is a major cause of death amongst Old English Sheepdogs.

Temperament
The breed standards describe the ideal Old English Sheepdog as never being nervous or aggressive. The New Zealand Kennel Club adds that "they are sometimes couch potatoes" and "may even try to herd children by gently bumping them." This breed's temperament can be described as intelligent, social and adaptable. The American Kennel Club adds that the breed has "a clownish energy" and "may try to herd people or other objects."

With wide open spaces being the ideal setting for an Old English Sheepdog, the breed is a natural fit in a rural setting, such as working on a farm; although, with proper exercise and training, they are perfectly comfortable with a suburban or urban lifestyle. Old English Sheepdogs should not be deprived of the company and the warmth of people.

Activities
The Old English Sheepdog can compete in dog agility trials, obedience, Rally obedience, Schutzhund, showmanship, flyball, tracking, and herding events. Herding instincts and trainability can be measured at noncompetitive herding tests. Old English Sheepdogs that exhibit basic herding instincts can be trained to compete in herding trials.

Coat care 

The Old English Sheepdog's long coat requires a thorough brushing at least once weekly, which may take one to three hours. Without regular care, the coat can become "a trap for dust, debris, fecal matter, urine and moisture." Matting may become painful to the animal, such as in between the toes, and can restrict movement in severe cases. Prospective owners may be deterred by the level of care required if long hair is desired.

The preferred method of grooming involves starting from the base of the hairs to keep the thick undercoat hair mat- and tangle-free. The brushing should be started at a very young age to get the dog used to it. A hairband may be used to keep a dog's fur out of its eyes. Many people trim their dogs' coats to a more manageable length. A professional quality electric shear reduces time spent trimming. However, dogs that are being shown in conformation must retain their natural coat.

Some people shave their Sheepdog's hair and spin it into yarn.

See also
 Dogs portal
 List of dog breeds
 Mr. Mugs
 "Martha My Dear", Beatles' song about Paul McCartney's Old English Sheepdog

References

External links

FCI breeds
Herding dogs
Dog breeds originating in England